Michael Foster is a former municipal politician in Toronto, Ontario, Canada. He was an alderman in the Metro Toronto municipality of North York from 1978 to 1985, and later campaigned for Mayor of North York in 1988.  He has also sought election to the Legislative Assembly of Ontario.  Foster is a member of the New Democratic Party (NDP).

Early life and career
Foster studying political science at York University. Before entering political life, he worked in community service, produced a television problem on community affairs, and was the administrator of a legal aid clinic. In June 1978, he was listed as a worker at Etobicoke's Welfare Action Centre.

North York councillor
Foster was first elected to North York's city council in 1978 with a narrow victory over the incumbent alderman, Marilyn Meshburg, who had defeated him in his first attempt two years earlier. Foster's challenge of Meshburg was somewhat unusual, in that both candidates were progressives on labour issues and other matters.  Meshburg was supported by the Metro Reform citizens' group, while Foster was backed by the municipal wing of the NDP and the Metro Labour Council. He was 24 years old at the time of the election.

Following his election, Foster sought to remove a legal loophole which allowed oil companies to pay lower taxes by classifying their property as farmland. In 1984, he called on the provincial government to forbid companies from charging user fees for Workers Compensation Board cases. Along with Howard Moscoe and Barbara Greene, Foster was considered a leading voice for reform on the council and frequently criticized the development policies of Mayor Mel Lastman.

He remained an alderman until 1985, when he unsuccessfully sought election to the city's Board of Control. He also campaigned for the Ontario legislature in the 1985 provincial election and finished second in Yorkview against Claudio Polsinelli. During his provincial campaign, Foster called for tenant protection, job creation and comprehensive workers compensation reforms.

Since 1985
After leaving North York council, Foster became a partner in Union Communications, an advertising and communications agency that specializes in progressive issues. He also worked as a Toronto Star columnist for two years, writing on political issues. In a 1986 article, he called on North York to adopt progressive housing policies. Foster also wrote in support of employment equity and pay equity policies, and on tax and transportation issues.

Foster challenged Mel Lastman for mayor of North York in 1988, but lost by a considerable margin. A fellow New Democrat, Howard Moscoe, argued that his campaign was poorly timed and Foster later acknowledged that it had been "a longshot".

Anthony Perruzza attempted to have Foster appointed as his replacement on the North York City council in 1990, following Perruzza's election to the Legislative Assembly of Ontario, but this plan came to nothing. Foster was awarded a Seneca College Distinguished Alumni Award in 2005 and remains active with Union Communications.

Footnotes

Year of birth missing (living people)
Living people
Ontario municipal councillors